Peter Martin Fries  (October 30, 1857 – July 29, 1937) was a Major League Baseball pitcher, who started three games for the 1883 Columbus Buckeyes and later played one game in the outfield for the 1884 Indianapolis Hoosiers. Both teams were in the American Association.

External links
Baseball Reference.com page

1857 births
1937 deaths
Indianapolis Hoosiers (AA) players
Columbus Buckeyes players
Major League Baseball pitchers
Baseball players from Pennsylvania
Sportspeople from Scranton, Pennsylvania
Bay City (minor league baseball) players
Stillwater (minor league baseball) players
19th-century baseball players